A small number of Serbian municipalities held local elections in 2003. These were not part of the country's regular cycle of local elections but took place in certain jurisdictions where the local government had fallen.

Serbia had introduced the direct election of mayors via two-round voting in 2002. Local assembly elections, which had been held under first past the post voting in single-member constituencies in the last regular cycle in 2000, were now determined by proportional representation with a three per cent electoral threshold. Successful lists were required to receive three per cent of all votes, not only of valid votes.

Results

Central Serbia

Ćuprija
After a period of political instability, elections took place in Ćuprija on 26 October 2003 to elect a mayor and members of the municipal assembly. The second round of voting in the mayoral election took place on 9 November 2003.

Results of the municipal assembly election:

Kraljevo
Sitting mayor Ljubiša Jovašević of the Democratic Party of Serbia had lost the support of the local assembly by mid-2003, and the local government had become unstable. The Serbian government dissolved the local parliament in July 2003 and called new mayoral and assembly elections for November. Marko Petrović, formerly of New Serbia, was appointed to lead a provisional administration pending the vote. The assembly election and the first round of the mayoral election took place on 16 November; the second round of the mayoral electoral took place on 30 November.

Results of the municipal assembly election:

References

Local elections in Serbia
Serbia